Events in the year 1979 in the Republic of India.

Incumbents
 President of India – Neelam Sanjiva Reddy
 Prime Minister of India – Morarji Desai until 28 July, Charan Singh
 Chief Justice of India – Yeshwant Vishnu Chandrachud

Governors
 Andhra Pradesh – K.C. Abraham 
 Assam – L. P. Singh 
 Bihar – 
 until 31 January: Jagannath Kaushal 
 31 January-20 September: K.B.N. Singh 
 starting 20 September: Akhlaqur Rahman Kidwai
 Gujarat – Sharda Mukherjee 
 Haryana – Harcharan Singh Brar (until 9 December), Surjit Singh Sandhawalia (starting 10 December)
 Himachal Pradesh – Amin ud-din Ahmad Khan 
 Jammu and Kashmir – L. K. Jha 
 Karnataka – Govind Narain 
 Kerala – Jothi Venkatachalam 
 Madhya Pradesh – C. M. Poonacha 
 Maharashtra – Sri Sadiq Ali 
 Manipur – L.P. Singh 
 Meghalaya – L.P. Singh 
 Nagaland – L.P. Singh 
 Odisha – Bhagwat Dayal Sharma
 Punjab – Jaisukh Lal Hathi
 Rajasthan – Raghukul Tilak
 Sikkim – B. B. Lal 
 Tamil Nadu – Prabhudas Patwari
 Tripura – L. P. Singh 
 Uttar Pradesh – Ganpatrao Devji Tapase 
 West Bengal – Anthony Lancelot Dias (until 6 November), Tribhuvana Narayana Singh (starting 6 November)

Events
 National income - 1,235,622 million
 1 January – President of India makes official the decision to set up the Mandal Commission
 22 January – 12 Iranian students who claimed to be members of the Iranian Islamic Students Association laid siege to the Iranian consulate at Churchgate.
 31 January – The police under direction of Jyoti Basu, Chief Minister of Communist Party of India (Marxist) -led government of West Bengal, surrounds and opens fire on unarmed refugee settlement of Morichjhapi island in Sunderbans, West Bengal. (Marichjhapi massacre) 
 13 May – a tropical cyclone hits Coastal Andhra and destroys 7 lakh homes and affects 40 lakh people.  
 1 June – Vizianagaram district is formed in Andhra Pradesh.
 27 June – CISF conflict at Bokaro
 2 July – Athi Varadhar came out after 40 years in Varadharaja Perumal Temple, Kanchipuram.
 3 July – A cargo ship named MV Kairali owned by Kerala Shipping Corporation went missing on its journey carrying iron ore from Mormugao to Rostock.
 28 July – Charan Singh of Bharatiya Lok Dal, coalition partner of Janata Party became Prime Minister of India with outside support of Congress (I).
 11 August – Morvi dam burst, the worst flood disaster in independent India, happens in Gujarat, killing 1500-15000 people
 12 October – C. H. Mohammed Koya sworn in as Chief minister of Kerala. He is the first Muslim League leader to become Chief Minister of an Indian state. 
 10 December – Mother Teresa was awarded Nobel Peace Prize at Oslo.

Law

Births

January to June
1 January  Vidya Balan, actress.
7 January – Bipasha Basu, actress and model.
28 February – Srikanth
24 March – Emraan Hashmi, actor.
23 May – Divya Palat, actress.
10 June – D. K. Ravi, late IAS officer. (d. 2015)
12 June – Tottempudi Gopichand, actor.

July to December
19 July  Malavika, actress.
27 July  Vamshi Paidipally, film director.
2 August  Devi Sri Prasad, music composer and singer.
31 August – Yuvan Shankar Raja, film composer and singer.
1 September – Aamir Ali, actor
11 September – Tulip Joshi, model and actress.
14 September – Kamya Panjabi, actress.
27 September – B Chandrakala, Indian Administrative Service officer.
7 October – Narain, actor.
23 October – Prabhas, actor.
4 November – Lazarus Barla, field hockey player.
 20 November  Shalini, actress and child artist.
14 December – Samit Basu, novelist.
30 December  Kausalya, actress.

Deaths
 9 February- Banaphool, author, playwright and poet (b. 1899).
 19 May – Hazari Prasad Dwivedi, novelist, literary historian, essayist, critic and scholar (b. 1907).
 18 August – Vasantrao Phulsing Naik, Politician, Former Chief Minister of Maharashtra (b. 1913)
 3 December – Dhyan Chand, field hockey player (b. 1905).
 8 October – Jayaprakash Narayan, political activist (b. 1902)
 20 October – D.K.Sapru, character actor. (b. 1916).

See also 
 List of Bollywood films of 1979

References

 
India
Years of the 20th century in India